Dioscorea wallichii is a type of climbing tuberous geophyte of the family Dioscoreaceae. It is native to Bangladesh, China, India, Malaysia, Myanmar, and Thailand. It has one edible cylindrical tuber that is about 1 meter long and 3-6 centimeters wide. The tuber is white when young, becoming yellow and stringy once aged.

Uses
The tubers can be eaten after boiling and washing.

References

wallichii
Taxa named by Joseph Dalton Hooker